Vladimir Anatolievich Khodov (October 9, 1976 – September 3, 2004) was one of the leaders of the hostage-takers in the 2004 Beslan school hostage crisis.

Early life
Vladimir was born in the Ukrainian town of Berdyansk. His mother Alexandra Samoshkina was a nurse, and his father's identity is unknown. When he was three years old, Vladimir's mother married a North Ossetian military engineer, Anatoly Khodov, and moved to Elkhotovo, 40 km from Beslan, where she worked in the maternity ward of a hospital. 

After separating from her husband, Alexandra moved with her sons to Beslan. According to some sources both sons attended the Beslan School Number One that was later the subject of the attack (Vladimir was known as Samoshkin there). Other sources do not confirm this information.  

In 1996 his brother Borik was sentenced to eight years imprisonment in Maykop for murder, following a stabbing incident in the village. While in prison, he converted to Islam. On one of his visits to his brother in Maykop,  Vladimir was accused of a rape, and left Russia to live with his grandfather in Berdyansk.

Later life
According to police records made public after the Beslan incident, after his return from  Ukraine, Vladimir got involved in Islam in Adygea, went to a madrassa in Cherkessia and even joined the Chechen insurgence (serving mostly as a cook). He served under Ruslan Gelayev and later Iles Gorchikhanov. Vladimir again moved out at the end of 2002, asking his parents to care for his cat Dima while he was absent.

In 2003, Borik was released from prison a year before his sentence was completed. Borik returned to Elkhotovo, and on July 1 he abducted Sveta Gabisova, a girl he had known earlier, claiming he was in love and wanted to marry her, despite her protests. Relatives rescued Sveta, and her brother Iriston visited Borik to complain about his behaviour - during the resulting fight, Borik was shot and killed. Vladimir returned for the funeral on July 22, but interrupted the funeral to take the body away for a Muslim burial.  Vladimir's disturbance caught the attention of the authorities, and after hiding in a local cleric's basement, he was arrested.  Despite being a wanted criminal, Vladimir was released by the police shortly after. Shamil Basayev has claimed that this was when Vladimir was given the choice of prison or helping to infiltrate the Chechen warlord's movement.
 
According to police records, Vladimir had already joined the "Taliban" training camp in Galashki (Ingushetia), and returned to it after his release.  On February 3, 2004 an exploding 122mm artillery shell in Vladikavkaz killed an army cadet and a nearby female.  By February 21 Vladimir had been declared the prime suspect, after being caught on videotape.

In Elkhotovo, an arsenal of weapons was found at the home of another convert and Vladimir's picture and code name (Abdullah) appeared on the FSB "Wanted" Internet Pages. A failed (and victimless) bomb attack on the Moscow to Vladikavkaz train near the Elkhotovo railway station in May 2004 was also blamed on Vladimir Khodov.

Siege
On the second day of the Beslan siege, Khodov reportedly stopped one of the other hostage-takers from killing a hostage named Larisa Kudzieva, and offered to free her two children if she agreed to wear an explosive belt and hijab in exchange; an offer which Kudzieva refused.

During the siege, authorities got Aleksandra to phone her son, hoping she could convince him to let the children go free.

After the attack
After the siege, there were rumours that he had survived and had been captured, died in custody, or had committed suicide in prison. 

After the attacks, his mother Aleksandra was taken into custody by the FSB though released from wrongdoing. She was evicted from Beslan in absentia and went to live in Vladikavkaz.

References

External links 

 Beslan terrorist mother evicted from her home - family history in Berdyansk
 "In fact, his last name is not Khodov, but Samoshkin." Mention of the rape charge
 Outraged at the Orthodox Christian funeral, Vladimir carried away the corpse. Mention of Vladikavkaz
 Basayev's words cause controversy
 Weapons found at Elkhotovo, from Moskovsky Komsomolets
 Wild rumours after the siege

1976 births
2004 deaths
People from Berdiansk
Beslan hostagetakers
Converts to Islam from Eastern Orthodoxy
Russian mass murderers
Former Russian Orthodox Christians
Russian Islamists